Bonhard Castle was an L-plan tower house, dating from the 16th century, around  south east of Bo'ness, in West Lothian, Scotland.

Alternative names were Bonhard House, and Polkmyl Tower.

History

The castle was owned by the Cornwalls of Bonhard.  It was subdivided into farm-servant's dwellings, and altered internally. After it was burned out in 1959, it was blown up in 1962.

Structure

The tower, which stood in a commanding position, had three storeys and a garret, with a semi-octagonal stair tower in the re-entrant angle.  The original doorway was at the foot of the stair tower.

There was a kitchen in the unvaulted basement, while the hall was on the first floor; there was 17th-century plasterwork on that floor.

The site is now occupied by a new house.

References

External links
 'Bonhard House', Geoff Bailey, Falkirk History Society

Castles in West Lothian